The 2007–08 Missouri Tigers men's basketball team represented the University of Missouri in the 2007-08 NCAA Division I men's basketball season. The head coach was Mike Anderson, who was in his 2nd year. The team played its home games in the Mizzou Arena in Columbia, Missouri.

Pre-season 

With Missouri returning four starters and eleven scholarship players from a team that surprised many by winning 18 games in head coach Mike Anderson's first year with the team, expectations were running high for the Tigers in 2007.  Among the returners was the 2007 Big 12 Conference Newcomer of the Year Stefhon Hannah.  In addition, the Tigers welcomed newcomer DeMarre Carroll as a transfer from Vanderbilt.  Carroll was named the Big 12's Preseason Newcomer of the Year.  With all of this in mind, the Big 12 coaches selected Missouri fifth in the Big 12 preseason poll.

The Tigers played two preseason games in 2007.  The first was against the University of Missouri–St. Louis, winning this game 78–51.  The second of their two preseason games was against Missouri Western State University.  They won this game by a score of 113–55.

Recruiting

Schedule 

|-
!colspan=12 style=|Preseason 

|-
!colspan=12 style=|Non-Conference Regular Season

|-
!colspan=12 style=|Big 12 Regular Season

|-
!colspan=12 style=|Big 12 Tournament

Roster

Final Season statistics 

starters in bold (Determined as five players with most starts)

See also 
2008 NCAA Men's Division I Basketball Tournament
2007-08 NCAA Division I men's basketball season
2007-08 NCAA Division I men's basketball rankings
List of NCAA Division I institutions

References 

Missouri
Missouri Tigers men's basketball seasons
2007 in sports in Missouri
Tiger